Bobby Ferguson may refer to:

Bobby Ferguson (footballer, born 1938) (1938–2018), English football player and manager
Bobby Ferguson (footballer, born 1945), Scottish international football goalkeeper

See also
Robert Ferguson (disambiguation)
Bob Ferguson (disambiguation)